Acacia graniticola is a shrub belonging to the genus Acacia and the subgenus Phyllodineae. It is native to an area in the Goldfields-Esperance and Weatbelt regions of Western Australia, and is found growing in sandy clay soils in semiarid scrubland in the region.

See also
 List of Acacia species

References

graniticola
Acacias of Western Australia
Taxa named by Bruce Maslin